Coloconger cadenati is an eel in the family Colocongridae (worm eels/short-tail eels). It was described by Robert H. Kanazawa in 1961. It is a marine, deep-water dwelling eel which is known from Senegal to the Gulf of Guinea in the eastern Atlantic Ocean. It is known from a depth range of 270–600 m. Males can reach a maximum total length of 90 cm.  The diet of C. cadenati consists primarily of benthic crustaceans.

Etymology
The eel is named in honor of ichthyologist Jean Cadenat (1908-1992), who was the Director of the Marine Biological Section of the Institut Français d’Afrique Noire in Gorée, Senegal, who supplied the type specimen.

References

Eels
Taxa named by Robert H. Kanazawa
Fish described in 1961